The 1910 Coupe de Chamonix was the second edition of the Coupe de Chamonix, an international ice hockey tournament. It was held from January 16-18, 1910, in Chamonix, France. Club des Patineurs de Paris from France won the tournament.

Results

Final Table

References

External links
 Tournament on hockeyarchives.info

Coupe de Chamonix
Chamonix
1910 in French sport